The 2017 Lombard autonomy referendum took place on 22 October in Lombardy, Italy.

The poll was not binding, but it might have consequences in terms of negotiations between the Italian government and Lombardy as the regional government will ask for more devolved powers since the "yes" won. Neighbouring Veneto also held a similar referendum on 22 October. Both President of Lombardy Roberto Maroni and President of Veneto Luca Zaia are members of Lega Nord (LN) and more specifically of Lega Lombarda and Liga Veneta, respectively. The LN is a strong proponent of federal reform, but in this case the referendums are also supported by the Five Star Movement.

See also 
 2017 Venetian autonomy referendum

References 

2017 elections in Italy
2017 referendums
21st century in Lombardy
Autonomy referendums
Elections in Lombardy
October 2017 events in Italy
Referendums in Italy